Janet Vivian Hooks (April 23, 1957 – October 9, 2014) was an American actress and comedian. Hooks was best known for her tenure on the NBC sketch comedy series Saturday Night Live, where she was a repertory player from 1986 to 1991. Following her departure from SNL, she continued making cameo appearances until 1994. Her subsequent work included a regular role on the final two seasons of Designing Women, a recurring role on 3rd Rock from the Sun, and a number of other film and television roles, including on 30 Rock and The Simpsons.

Early life
Hooks was born and raised in Decatur, Georgia, where she attended Canby Lane Elementary School and Towers High School. In 1974, her junior year, she moved to Fort Myers, Florida, when her father, a Sears employee, was transferred. She attended Cypress Lake High School, made her stage debut in a play there, and graduated in 1975. She attended Edison State College where she majored in theatre, but left to pursue acting full-time.

Career
Hooks began her career as a member of the Los Angeles-based comedy troupe The Groundlings and in an Atlanta nightclub act called The Wits End Players.

From 1980 to 1981, she appeared in Tush on Ted Turner's television station, WTBS, which eventually became TBS. She gained attention in the early 1980s on the HBO comedy series Not Necessarily the News and made guest appearances on Comedy Break with Mack & Jamie in the mid-1980s. She made her film debut in Pee-wee's Big Adventure as a know-it-all tour guide at the Alamo and appeared in the Goldie Hawn film Wildcats.

In 1985, Hooks met with producer Lorne Michaels about a spot on Saturday Night Live, but was passed over in favor of Joan Cusack. After the show's 1985–86 season was deemed a ratings disaster and the show was put on the chopping block for cancellation, Michaels offered Hooks another chance. This time, despite a six-minute audition she called "brutal", she was offered a contract along with fellow new recruits Dana Carvey, Phil Hartman, Victoria Jackson and Kevin Nealon. They helped lead the show to a sustained ratings increase and a return to the national spotlight. Hooks's characters included Candy Sweeney of The Sweeney Sisters. She also played famous political wives of the era, including Nancy Reagan, Hillary Clinton, Kitty Dukakis, Betty Ford, and Elizabeth Dole, and did notable impressions of Bette Davis, Sinéad O'Connor, Tammy Faye Bakker, Ivana Trump, Kathie Lee Gifford, and Diane Sawyer.

Tiring of the stress of performing on a live show, Hooks left SNL in 1991 after being asked by Linda Bloodworth-Thomason to replace Jean Smart on the CBS sitcom Designing Women. Hooks played Carlene Dobber for the show's final two seasons. She also continued to make occasional appearances on SNL through 1994, usually playing Hillary Clinton. During her time in SNL, she dated Kevin Nealon.

Hooks continued to work in supporting roles and guest appearances for several years, but with declining frequency. She had a recurring role as Vicki Dubcek on 3rd Rock from the Sun, which earned her an Emmy Award nomination. She guest-starred on two Matt Groening-produced cartoons for the Fox Broadcasting Company: six episodes of The Simpsons between 1997 and 2002, as Apu's wife Manjula (although Tress MacNeille sometimes substituted for her, and eventually replaced her), and in the Futurama episode "Bendless Love", as the voice of the robot Angleyne. She starred as Dixie Glick in the series Primetime Glick and the movie Jiminy Glick in Lalawood. She had small parts in several other movies, including Batman Returns as Jen, the Penguin's image consultant during his campaign to become mayor of Gotham City. She made two appearances on 30 Rock in 2010, playing Jenna Maroney's mother, Verna, the last live-action spots Hooks did. She guest-starred in the 2013 The Cleveland Show episode "Mr. and Mrs. Brown", which was her final acting job.

According to a 2014 Grantland article about her career and death, Hooks's anxiety about acting and passive approach to her career led to her missing out on prestigious auditions and lucrative acting roles. Tina Fey said after her death that she was angry that Hooks didn't have a more successful career (Fey said that Hooks was a bigger star on SNL than Rob Schneider, and should have had at least as big a film career as he did). Hooks's friend, film critic Ann Hornaday, said that Hooks didn't have doors slammed in her face and often made no effort to seek out work. Hooks turned down a role in the 2003 television film The Music Man (which went to Molly Shannon) and declined to reprise her SNL sketch "The Sweeney Sisters" with Nora Dunn in a special appearance at Carnegie Hall in 2014. Hooks's friend Bill Tush speculated that her drinking had made her indifferent toward her career, but also said she might not have wanted more money or fame. Another friend said that Hooks had decided to work only enough to keep her Screen Actors Guild health insurance.

Death
Hooks's doctor had advised her to stop drinking due to liver damage, but she did not try to quit. She was diagnosed with leukemia in February 2009, which was treated and went into remission that May. In April 2014, Hooks discovered a bump on her throat. She was given a biopsy and treated at Memorial Sloan Kettering Cancer Center, but the tumor was unresponsive to chemotherapy and continued to grow. Doctors said the only remaining option was a total laryngectomy, which Hooks declined. She arranged for hospice care and used prescription drugs, wine, and cigarettes to manage her pain. Her ability to speak, eat and breathe declined. 

On the evening of October 9, she eventually succumbed to throat cancer at age 57. Her remains were interred in Northview Cemetery in Cedartown, Georgia.

The Simpsons episode "Super Franchise Me" memorialized her on October 12, 2014, with her longtime character Manjula Nahasapeemapetilon honored in the credits.

"Love Is a Dream"
SNL paid tribute to Hooks in the third episode of its 40th season on October 11, 2014. Guest host Bill Hader and Kristen Wiig introduced a tribute in which SNL reaired a short she had filmed with Phil Hartman in 1988, "Love Is a Dream". This short film had also been reaired to honor Hartman following his death in 1998. It is described as "a sweet and melodramatic tribute to the 1948 film The Emperor Waltz", which was directed by Billy Wilder and starred Bing Crosby and Joan Fontaine. The scene casts Hooks as an aging woman who vanishes into her own imagination to sing and share a dance with a long-lost lover (Hartman). Hooks and Hartman appear to lip-sync to the original singing voices from the 1948 film. One critic wrote that the "Jan Hooks tribute showed that Jan did not need to be funny in order to captivate the attention of her audience", as Hooks and Hartman were known to be quiet and reserved off screen.

Filmography

Film

Television

See also
 Saturday Night Live parodies of Hillary Clinton

References

External links
 
 

1957 births
2014 deaths
20th-century American actresses
21st-century American actresses
Actresses from Georgia (U.S. state)
American film actresses
American impressionists (entertainers)
American sketch comedians
American television actresses
American voice actresses
American women comedians
Deaths from cancer in New York (state)
Deaths from throat cancer
People from Decatur, Georgia
University of West Florida alumni
20th-century American comedians
21st-century American comedians